Typhoon Gay, also known as the Kavali Cyclone of 1989, was a small but powerful tropical cyclone which caused more than 800 fatalities in and around the Gulf of Thailand in November 1989. The worst typhoon to affect the Malay Peninsula in thirty-five years, Gay originated from a monsoon trough over the Gulf of Thailand in early November. Owing to favorable atmospheric conditions, the storm rapidly intensified, attaining winds over 120km/h (75mph) by 3November. Later that day, Gay became the first typhoon since 1891 to make landfall in Thailand, striking Chumphon Province with winds of 185km/h (115mph). The small storm emerged into the Bay of Bengal and gradually reorganized over the following days as it approached southeastern India. On 8November, Gay attained its peak intensity as a Category5-equivalent cyclone with winds of 260km/h (160mph). The cyclone then moved ashore near Kavali, Andhra Pradesh. Rapid weakening ensued inland, and Gay dissipated over Maharashtra early on 10 November.

The typhoon's rapid development took hundreds of vessels by surprise, leading to 275 offshore fatalities. Of these, 91 occurred after an oil drilling ship, the Seacrest, capsized amid  swells. Across the Malay Peninsula, 588 people died from various storm-related incidents. Several towns in coastal Chumphon were destroyed. Losses throughout Thailand totaled . Striking India as a powerful cyclone, Gay damaged or destroyed about 20,000 homes in Andhra Pradesh, leaving 100,000 people homeless.

Meteorological history

In early November, a monsoon trough over the Gulf of Thailand showed signs of tropical cyclogenesis. A small, concentrated area of convection quickly developed over a low-pressure area within the trough, and on 2November the system became sufficiently organized for the Joint Typhoon Warning Center (JTWC) to issue a Tropical Cyclone Formation Alert. Owing to its small size, the system began strengthening within the narrow gulf by taking advantage of warm waters and good outflow. Moving generally northwestward, it became a tropical depression later that day and underwent rapid intensification. As the newly named Tropical Storm Gay strengthened, it "presented a paradox to forecasters", according to Lieutenant Dianne K. Crittenden; synoptic data from Malaysia and Thailand indicated decreasing wind speeds and increasing barometric pressures around the storm, but these observations were later interpreted as increased subsidence.

Strengthening faster than anticipated, Gay attained typhoon status early on 3November. Later that day, the storm developed an eye before passing over the Seacrest, an oil drilling ship. On 4November, Gay's winds increased to 185km/h (115mph), equivalent to a Category3 hurricane on the Saffir–Simpson hurricane scale, before making landfall in Chumphon Province, Thailand, at 0600UTC. The Japan Meteorological Agency assessed that the storm had ten-minute sustained winds of 140km/h (85mph) and a pressure of 960mbar (hPa; 28.35inHg). Crossing the Kra Isthmus, Gay weakened to minimal typhoon status as it entered the Bay of Bengal. According to the India Meteorological Department (IMD), Gay was the first typhoon since 1891 to form in the Gulf of Thailand and enter the Bay of Bengal. Responding to a ridge to its north, Gay maintained a west-northwestward to northwestward track for the next four days. The storm gradually restrengthened as it moved through an area of low wind shear and warm waters; however, this was limited by restrictions to the cyclone's outflow. Early on 6November, Gay passed near the Andaman Islands as a Category2-equivalent cyclone.

After changing little in intensity for much of 6November, Gay strengthened as the ridge to its north intensified and the previous restrictions to its outflow diminished. The storm moved due west through a small fetch of warmer waters, fueling the process of intensification over the next 42 hours. Based on estimates provided through the use of the Dvorak technique, the JTWC assessed Gay to have attained its peak intensity as a Category5-equivalent cyclone with winds of 260km/h (160mph) early on 8November. Around this time, the IMD estimated that the storm had three-minute sustained winds of 230km/h (145mph), classifying Gay as a modern-day super cyclonic storm. Additionally, the agency estimated the cyclone's central pressure to have decreased to 930mbar (hPa; 27.46inHg). Around 1800UTC, Gay made landfall over a sparsely populated area near Kavali, India, in Andhra Pradesh. Upon coming ashore, the storm's eye was about 20km (12mi) wide, with gale-force winds within 95km (60mi) of the center. Now over land, Gay no longer had access to warm waters, causing it to weaken to a tropical storm less than twelve hours after this landfall. The storm continued to deteriorate while moving across India, before it completely dissipated over Maharashtra on 10 November.

Impact and aftermath

Gulf of Thailand

The most powerful storm to affect the Gulf of Thailand in more than thirty-five years, Gay produced  swells which caught many ships in the region off-guard. At least 16 vessels were reported missing by 5November, including the  Unocal Corporation oil drilling ship Seacrest. According to survivors, the vessel received no warning of the developing typhoon. Just when all crew members were about to abandon ship, the eye passed over. Winds fluctuated violently and changed direction, preventing the ship from remaining stabilized despite being within safe operating limits. The vessel abruptly capsized with all 97 crew members on board during the overnight hours of 3November, before any life boats could be deployed. Initial rescue attempts on 4November were hampered by rough seas. Two days after the sinking, four rescue ships and two helicopters in the region were searching for survivors; four people were rescued from the wreckage on 6November. Divers from the Thai Navy were sent to search the capsized vessel for anyone trapped inside. Of the crew, only six survived; 25 bodies were recovered, and the remaining 66 members were presumed dead. Losses from the sinking of the Seacrest totaled $40million. Another 20 cargo and fishing ships sank during the storm, resulting in 140 fatalities.

Thailand

Striking Thailand with unprecedented strength, Typhoon Gay caused catastrophic damage across many of its provinces. Areas between Chumphon and Rayong provinces were severely affected by heavy rains, high winds and large swells. Rainfall amounts peaked at Chumphon, where  fell during the cyclone's passage. Widespread disruption of communication and electricity occurred in most areas south of Bangkok; many households remained without power for weeks. Damaging winds uprooted numerous trees and power poles and toppled wooden houses built on stilts. Exacerbated by deforestation, flash flooding triggered by the storm damaged or destroyed thousands of homes and caused at least 365 fatalities. Several towns and villages across Chumphon province were devastated, and one of the destroyed villages "looked like it had been bombed" according to the Bangkok Post. Entire districts were reportedly "flattened" in Chumphon and Prachuap Khiri Khan provinces. The typhoon destroyed many schools across Chumphon and Surat Thani provinces, many of which were constructed of wood. All structures close to the storm's path had their windows and doors blown out, and some multi-story buildings lost their upper floors. A few schools constructed from reinforced concrete sustained little damage. More than a thousand roads and 194 bridges were damaged or washed away. Onshore, 558 fatalities were attributed to the storm, and another 44 died just offshore. Throughout Thailand, approximately 47,000 homes were damaged or destroyed, and more than 200,000 people were affected, of which about 153,000 were left homeless. Monetary losses reached 11billion baht (US$456.5million), ranking Gay as one of the costliest disasters in the country's history.

Within a week of the storm's passage, the Government of Thailand began distributing relief goods to residents throughout the affected provinces. Despite the effort by the government, 2,500 people from Pa Thiew and Tha Sae demonstrated for additional and more intensive aid on 9November. These protests were soon dispersed. Following considerable criticism for downplaying the impact of the typhoon, Prime Minister Chatichai Choonhavan delayed his visit to the United States to oversee relief efforts. By 15 November the United States pledged to donate US$25,000 for recovery operations. Telephone connection was restored from Bangkok to Prachuap Khiri Khan by this time; however, areas further south remained disconnected. Generators were brought in to keep hospitals and government offices running since much of Chumphon Province remained without electricity for more than two weeks. As the scale of damage became more apparent, a request for international aid was made by 17 November to the United Nations Disaster Relief Organization. Upon the announcement of the request, six countries pledged to provide nearly US$510,000 in funds collectively. Agriculture across Surat Thani Province was severely affected by the typhoon in the long-term as well. In the four years following Typhoon Gay, land use for orchards, rubber, and oil palm plantations decreased from 33.32percent to 30.53percent. Additionally, rice paddy coverage decreased from 22.96percent to 13.03percent.

Following post-storm surveys, it was determined that most of the severely damaged schools had been built improperlybuilding codes in Thailand mandate that structures withstand up to 120kgf/m2 of pressure from winds. In the years following the typhoon, studies determined how best to rebuild: reinforced concrete structures which can last fifty years.

India

After crossing the Malay Peninsula, Gay moved through the Andaman Islands on 6November. As a precautionary measure, all air and sea traffic were suspended to the region. Winds in excess of 120km/h (75mph) battered North Andaman Island, causing two structures to collapse. A few days before the cyclone made landfall, officials in Andhra Pradesh began evacuating roughly 50,000 residents along the coast and stockpiled relief goods. Some people were forced to leave vulnerable locations in the Visakhapatnam and Srikakulam districts. Local meteorologists warned that the storm was comparable to a cyclone in 1977 that killed more than ten thousand. Striking the southern coast of Andhra Pradesh, Gay produced wind gusts estimated at 230km/h (145mph). Transportation and communication across the region was disrupted and 20,000 homes were damaged or destroyed, leaving at least 100,000 people homeless. Nearly every structure in Annagaripalem were severely damaged or destroyed. Offshore, 25 fishermen drowned near Machilipatnam after ignoring warnings to return to port. Throughout Andhra Pradesh, 69 fatalities and  worth of damage was attributed to Gay. In the months after the storm, concrete shelters were built to house displaced persons.

See also

 List of the most intense tropical cyclones in the Northern Indian Ocean
 Cyclone Forrest
 Tropical Storm Podul (2013)
 Tropical Depression Wilma (2013)
 Tropical Storm Harriet (1962)
 Typhoon Durian

Notes

References

External links

 Japan Meteorological Agency
 Joint Typhoon Warning Center 
 India Meteorological Department

1989 North Indian Ocean cyclone season
1989 Pacific typhoon season
Super cyclonic storms
Tropical cyclones in India
Typhoons
Typhoons in Thailand
Malay Peninsula
History of Andhra Pradesh (1947–2014)
Disasters in Andhra Pradesh
1989 in Asia
1989 in Thailand
Tropical cyclones in Myanmar
1989 disasters in Malaysia
1989 in Malaysia
1989 disasters in India
1989 disasters in Thailand